Andrés Pablo Forray (born March 20, 1986), also called Toto Forray,  is an Argentine-born naturalized Italian professional basketball player for Aquila Basket Trento of the Lega Basket Serie A (LBA). He is a  point guard.

Professional career
Andrés Forray is in Italy since 2003, but he grew up with Club Banco Provincia di Buenos Aires youth team.

His first team in Italy was Pallacanestro Messina from the 2003-04 season already in the first and highest-tier level of the Italian league pyramid. He had the opportunity to play with popular and great players like Matt Bonner.

Forray later played with Virtus Padova (one season) and JesoloSandonà Basket (two seasons) in Serie B until 2008, when Fulgor Libertas Forlì club offered him a three years contract from 2008 to 2011.

In January 2011 he went to Aquila Basket Trento. With the Trento based club he achieved the promotion to Serie A2 in 2012, the championship of the Italian LNP Cup in 2013 and the promotion to the highest-tier level of the Italian basketball league sysyem. Since the 2014–15 season he played in LBA. In August 2016 Toto Forray renews the contract with Trento for the next 3 years.

In 2016 Forray became the new Aquila Basket Trento captain as Davide Pascolo left the club June of the same year.

Honours and titles

Team
Serie A2 Basket winner (2): 2012, 2014
Italian LNP Cup winner (1): 2013

References

External links
Lega Basket Serie A profile  Retrieved 14 December 2016
Serie A2 Basket profile  Retrieved 14 December 2016

1986 births
Living people
Aquila Basket Trento players
Argentine expatriate basketball people in Italy
Argentine men's basketball players
Fulgor Libertas Forlì players
Italian men's basketball players
Lega Basket Serie A players
Point guards
Basketball players from Buenos Aires